The Battle of Vítkov Hill was a part of the Hussite Wars. The battle pitted the forces of Sigismund, Holy Roman Emperor, against Hussite forces under command of Jan Žižka (in English, John Zizka). Vítkov Hill was located on the edge of the city of Prague and the battle occurred in a vineyard established by Sigismund's father, Charles IV. It ended with a decisive Hussite victory.

Background
On 1 March 1420 Pope Martin V published a papal bull in which he ordered that Sigismund and all Eastern princes had to organize a crusade against the Hussite followers of Jan Hus, John Wycliffe and other heretics. On 15 March in Wrocław, Emperor Sigismund ordered the execution of Jan Krása, a Hussite and leader of the Wrocław Uprising in 1418. On 17 March, the papal legate Ferdinand de Palacios published the bull in Wrocław. Then, the Utraquist faction of Hussites understood that they would not reach an agreement with him. They united with Taborite Hussites and decided to defend against the emperor.

The crusaders assembled their army in Świdnica. On 4 April, Taborite forces destroyed Catholic forces in Mladá Vožice. On 7 April, Taborites, commanded by Nicholas of Hus, captured Sedlice, and they later captured Písek, Rábí Castle, Strakonice and Prachatice. In late April, the crusading army crossed the Bohemian border. In early May, they captured Hradec Králové. On 7 May Čeněk of Wartenberg surrounded Hradčany.

Battles in Benešov and near Kutná Hora
The Crusader force of 400 infantry and knights, commanded by Peter of Sternberg, attempted to defend Benešov from the Taborites. After the battle, the crusader forces were destroyed, and the town was burned. Near Kutná Hora, the crusader forces, commanded by Janek z Chtěnic and Pippo Spano (Filippo Scolari), attacked the formations of the Taborites, without success.

On 22 May, the Taborite forces entered Prague. Jan Žižka destroyed the crusaders' relief column, which had to secure supplies that were sent to Hradčany and Vyšehrad. Meanwhile, the crusading army captured Slaný, Louny and Mělník.

Defence of Prague

The siege began on 12 June. The crusaders' forces, in the opinions of the chroniclers, consisted of 100,000-200,000 soldiers (according to Victor Verney, a modern historian, they probably had only 80,000 soldiers). One of the most important points in the fortifications of Prague was Vítkov Hill. The fortifications on the hill secured roads on the crusaders' supply lines and were made from timber but were consolidated with a stone-and-clay wall and moats. On the southern part of the hill was a standing tower, and the northern part was secured by a steep cliff. The fortifications were said to be defended by 26 men and three women, but in the opinion of J. Durdik, it was probably about 60 soldiers. On 13 July, the crusaders' cavalry crossed the River Vltava and began their attack. The next day, Hussite relief troops surprise-attacked the knights through the vineyards on the southern side of the hill on which the battle was fought. The attack forced the crusaders down the steep northern cliff. Panic spread among them, which resulted in their rout from the field. During the retreat, many knights drowned in the Vltava. Most of Žižka's forces were soldiers armed with flails and guns.

The battle was a clear victory for the Hussites. The crusaders lost between 
400-500 knights. In honour of the battle, Vítkov Hill was renamed Žižkov after Jan Žižka. As a consequence of the Hussite victory on Vítkov, the crusaders lost any hope of starving the city into submission and their army disintegrated. The National Monument still exists on the hill, and in 2003, local officials were attempting to replant the vineyard.

Sigismund and his troops then held the castles of Vyšehrad and Hradčany. However, they soon capitulated, and Sigismund had to withdraw from Prague. The crusaders later withdrew to Kutná Hora and began local warfare.

References

Piotr Marczak "Wojny Husyckie" (English, "Hussites Wars") pages 61–67 published 2003 by "Egros" Warsaw

External links
 Bellum.cz – Battle of Vítkov Hill 4 July 1420

1420 in Europe
Vitkov Hill 1420
Vitkov Hill 1420
Vitkov Hill
Battles in Bohemia
Conflicts in 1420
Jan Žižka
Military history of Prague